Galepsus or Galepsos was a town on the north coast of the peninsula of Sithonia, Chalcidice, ancient Macedonia. William Martin Leake states that Galepsus was the same place afterwards called Physcella, a distinction which was required, as there was another Galepsus at no great distance. 

The site of Galepsus is about 1 mile (1.6 km) south of the modern Nikite.

See also
 Galepsus (Thrace)

References

Populated places in ancient Macedonia
Former populated places in Greece
Geography of ancient Chalcidice